The Lepidoptera of Midway Atoll consist of both the butterflies and moths recorded from the islands of Midway Atoll. Midway Atoll is part of a chain of volcanic islands, atolls, and seamounts extending from Hawai'i up to the tip of the Aleutian Islands.

According to a recent estimate, there are a total of 36 Lepidoptera species present on the Midway Atoll.

Butterflies

Nymphalidae
Vanessa cardui (Linnaeus, 1758)

Moths

Arctiidae
Utetheisa pulchelloides Hampson, 1907

Cosmopterigidae
Asymphorodes dimorpha (Busck, 1914)
Undescribed Asymphorodes species
Hyposmocoma neckerensis (Swezey, 1926)
Hyposmocoma rubescens Walsingham, 1907
Pyroderces rileyi (Walsingham, 1882)

Crambidae
Hellula undalis (Fabricius, 1781)
Herpetogramma licarsisalis (Walker, 1859)
Spoladea recurvalis (Fabricius, 1775)

Geometridae
Cyclophora nanaria (Walker, 1861)
Macaria abydata Guenee, 1857

Gracilariidae
Stoeberhinus testaceus Butler, 1881

Noctuidae
Achaea janata (Linnaeus, 1758)
Agrotis fasciata (Rothschild, 1894)
Agrotis ipsilon (Hufnagel, 1767)
Chrysodeixis eriosoma (Doubleday, 1843)
Helicoverpa zea (Boddie, 1850)
Hypena laceratalis Walker, 1858
Leucania loreyimima Rungs, 1953
Pseudaletia unipuncta (Haworth, 1809)
Spodoptera exempta (Walker, 1856)
Spodoptera litura (Fabricius, 1775)
Spodoptera mauritia (Boisduval, 1833)

Plutellidae
Plutella xylostella (Linnaeus, 1758)

Pterophoridae
Lioptilodes parvus (Walsingham, 1880)
Megalorhipida leucodactylus (Fabricius, 1793)

Pyralidae
Pyralis manihotalis Guenee, 1854

Sphingidae
Agrius cingulata (Fabricius, 1775)
Deilephila nerii (Linnaeus, 1758)

Tineidae
Erechthias simulans (Butler, 1882)
Monopis meliorella (Walker, 1863)
Opogona aurisquamosa (Butler, 1881)

Tortricidae
Amorbia emigratella Busck, 1910
Undescribed Bactra  Bactra straminea (Butler, 1881)
Crocidosema blackburni (Butler, 1881)

External links
A Review of the Insects and Related Arthropods of Midway Atoll

Lepidoptera
Midway Atoll
Midway Atoll
Midway Atoll
Midway Atoll
Lepidoptera of Midway Atoll